Sarah Rees Brennan (born 21 September 1983) is an Irish writer best known for young adult fantasy fiction. Her first novel, The Demon's Lexicon, was released June 2009 by Simon & Schuster. Rees Brennan's books are bestsellers in the UK.

Life and career
Rees Brennan was born in Ireland. She lived in New York after college. She obtained a Creative Writing MA from Kingston University in London and worked as a librarian in Surrey, England, before moving to Dublin where she currently lives.

Rees Brennan has been writing since the age of five. She has a blog on Livejournal which has over 4000 subscribers.

She wrote her first novel, The Demon's Lexicon, while studying for her Creative Writing MA. The publishing house Simon & Schuster obtained a three-book contract deal with her which involved an undisclosed six-figure sum.  Since then she has written and collaborated on many bestselling and award-nominated works including In Other Lands and her tie-in work with Netflix.

Rees Brennan is a cancer survivor,  and has been diagnosed with stage 4 Hodgkins Lymphoma in 2017.

Novels

Demon's Lexicon Trilogy
The Demon's Lexicon, June 2009
The Demon's Covenant, May 2010
The Demon's Surrender, June 2011

Lynburn Legacy
 Unspoken, June 2012 (Book 1)
 Untold, August 2013 (Book 2) 
 Unmade, 2014 (Book 3)
 The Spring Before I Met You, September 2012 (Book 0.25)
 The Summer Before I Met You, September 2012 (Book 0.5)
 The Night After I Lost You (Book 1.5)

Chilling Adventures of Sabrina
 Season of the Witch (Book 1), July 2019
 Daughter of Chaos (Book 2), December 2019
 Path of Night (Book 3), May 2020

C.S. Pacat's Fence novelisations
 Fence: Striking Distance, September 2020
 Fence: Disarmed, May 2021

Shadowhunters Universe
 Team Human, co-authored with Justine Larbalestier, July 2012
 The Bane Chronicles, co-authored with Cassandra Clare and Maureen Johnson
 Tales from the Shadowhunter Academy, co-authored with Cassandra Clare, Maureen Johnson and Robin Wasserman

Fate: The Winx Saga
 The Fairies' Path, as Ava Corrigan, March 2021
 Lighting the Fire, August 2022

Other
 Tell the Wind and Fire, April 2016
 In Other Lands, August 2017

Short fiction
 "Undead Is Very Hot Right Now" in The Eternal Kiss, ed. Trisha Telep
 "The Spy Who Never Grew Up" in Kiss Me Deadly, ed. Trisha Telep
 "Queen of Atlantis" in Subterranean Press Magazine: Summer 2011, ed. Gwenda Bond
 "Lets Get This Undead Show on the Road" in Enthralled: Paranormal Diversions, ed. Melissa Marr
 "Faint Heart" in After, ed. Ellen Datlow and Terri Windling
 "Treasure and Maidens" in Scheherazade's Facade, ed. Michael M. Jones
 "I Gave You My Love by the Light of The Moon" in Defy the Dark, ed. Saundra Mitchell
 "Beauty and the Chad" in Grim, ed. Christine Johnson
 "Wings in the Morning" in 'Monstrous Affections', ed. Kelly Link

Awards

The Demon's Lexicon
A 2010 ALA Top Ten Best Book
Long-listed for the Carnegie medal
Top Ten Best British YA Fantasy
A 2009 Cybils Finalist
 A finalist for the Leeds Book Award
 Received three starred reviews from Kirkus Reviews, Bulletin and School Library Journal.

Unmade
A 2015 nominee for the Andre Norton Award

In Other Lands
A 2018 finalist for the World Science Fiction Society Award for Best Young Adult Book
Notable Mention - 2017 NYT Fall's Best YA Fantasy

References

External links
 
 Queen of Atlantis - Subterranean Press Magazine Summer 2011
 Blog at Live Journal
 Cover art and more at Fantastic Fiction
 Author profile at Simon & Schuster
 
 

1984 births
Irish children's writers
Irish women children's writers
English librarians
British women librarians
Irish bloggers
Irish women bloggers
Irish fantasy writers
Fan fiction writers
Place of birth missing (living people)
Living people
Irish women novelists
Alumni of Kingston University